The WAGR Dm class was a class of 4-6-4T tank locomotive operated by the Western Australian Government Railways (WAGR) between 1945 and 1971.

Background
World War II was a major setback for Western Australia's railway system. The need to move large numbers of troops and material had taken its toll on the ability of the railways to continue the construction of much needed motive power. During the war years only 13 new locomotives were built, three S class and 10 Australian Standard Garratts. By 1944, approximately a quarter of the WAGR's locomotive fleet was out of action pending maintenance. Much of it was over forty years old.

History
The Dm class was based on the earlier D class but differed significantly in the addition of large boiler-length side tanks, and was built by converting older E class tender locomotives. They were built to haul suburban passenger services in Perth. They were also used as bank engines on the steeply graded Midland Junction to Chidlow section of the Eastern Railway.

The first entered service on 29 March 1945. The first was withdrawn in 1968, with the remainder in 1970/71 following the entry into service of the ADK/ADB class diesel multiple units.

Class list
The numbers and periods in service of each member of the Dm class were as follows:

See also 

Rail transport in Western Australia
List of Western Australian locomotive classes

References

Notes

Cited works

External links

Railway locomotives introduced in 1945
Dm WAGR class
3 ft 6 in gauge locomotives of Australia
4-6-4T locomotives
Passenger locomotives